Sir Henry Lindo Ferguson  (7 April 1858 – 22 January 1948), known as Lindo Ferguson, was a New Zealand ophthalmologist, university professor and medical school dean. He was born in London, England, on 7 April 1858. Ferguson's parents were Louisa Ann Du Bois and William Ferguson. The family moved from Burton upon Trent, England, to Dublin, Ireland, in 1866.

Ferguson started college in 1873 at the Royal College of Science for Ireland. After earning a scholarship in industrial chemistry, he decided to instead study medicine at the Trinity College Dublin. He earned his medical degree in 1880 and continued his studies, specialising in ophthalmology. The Ferguson family moved to New Zealand in 1883, choosing Dunedin because of its medical school. Ferguson was the first ophthalmologist in Australasia.

Ferguson was appointed a Companion of the Order of St Michael and St George in the 1918 King's Birthday Honours. In the 1924 New Year Honours, he was appointed a Knight Bachelor. In 1935, he was awarded the King George V Silver Jubilee Medal. He was appointed a Commander of the Order of St John in 1937.

References

1858 births
1948 deaths
Irish ophthalmologists
British emigrants to New Zealand
Academic staff of the University of Otago
New Zealand ophthalmologists
New Zealand Companions of the Order of St Michael and St George
New Zealand Knights Bachelor
Commanders of the Order of St John